The 2012 Virginia Tech Hokies football team represented Virginia Polytechnic Institute and State University in the 2012 NCAA Division I FBS football season. They were led by 26th year head coach Frank Beamer and played their home games at Lane Stadium. They were a member of the Coastal Division of the Atlantic Coast Conference. They finished the season 7–6, 4–4 in ACC play to finish in fourth place in the Coastal Division. They were invited to the Russell Athletic Bowl where they defeated Rutgers in overtime.

Schedule

Rankings
	
Entering the 2012 season, Virginia Tech was ranked No. 16 in the AP and No. 20 Coaches' Preseason Polls. 
The Hokies rose all the way to No. 13 by Week 3, before dropping out of the polls completely after a 35-17 loss to Pitt.

References

Virginia Tech
Virginia Tech Hokies football seasons
Cheez-It Bowl champion seasons
Virginia Tech Hokies football